Boa Esporte Clube, commonly known as just Boa Esporte or Boa, is a Brazilian football club from Varginha, Minas Gerais state. The club was formerly known as Ituiutaba Esporte Clube.

History
The club was founded on 30 April 1947, in Ituiutaba city, as Ituiutaba Esporte Clube. They won the Campeonato Mineiro Módulo II in 2004, and the Taça Minas Gerais in 2007. They lost the Campeonato Brasileiro Série C to ABC Futebol Clube in 2010. During the 2011 season, the club played in Varginha, adopting the name Boa Esporte Clube, and will return to Ituiutaba after the new stadium is built. As Boa Esporte Clube, they won the Campeonato Mineiro Second Level in 2011.

Boa Esporte played the Série B between 2011 and 2015, almost being promoted to the first division in their debut year (when they were 4 points away from 4th placer Sport Recife), and in 2014 (2 points away from 4th placer Avaí FC). Despite being second to last in 2015, they were the surprise winners of the 2016 Série C.

In March 2017, the club came to international media attention for their signing of Bruno Fernandes de Souza.  Bruno was convicted of dismembering his mistress, Eliza Samudio, in 2010 and feeding her remains to his pet dogs, in a dispute over child support. In March 2013, he was sentenced to 22 years, however, he was granted release on appeal. This signing led to multiple sponsors, such as Gois and Silva, dropping the club and has led to protests and outrage in Brazil. Bruno's signing while awaiting appeal has led to various Human Rights organizations to protest that clubs like Boa Esporte do not value women or abuses against them by players.

Achievements
 Campeonato Brasileiro Série C:
 Winners (1): 2016
 Runners-up (1): 2010
 Campeonato Mineiro Módulo II:
 Winners (2): 2004, 2011
 Taça Minas Gerais:
 Winners (2): 2007, 2012

Stadium

The club plays their home games at Estádio Municipal Prefeito Luiz Dilzon de Melo, commonly known as Melão. The stadium is located in Varginha, and has a maximum capacity of 27,000 people.

As Ituiutaba Esporte Clube, the club played their home games at Estádio da Fazendinha, located in Ituiutaba. The stadium has a maximum capacity of 3,840 people.

Current squad
As of 13 September 2021

References

External links
  Official website
  Ituiutaba Esporte Clube at Arquivo de Clubes

 
Association football clubs established in 1947
Football clubs in Minas Gerais
1947 establishments in Brazil
Campeonato Brasileiro Série C winners